The Montreal Impact was a Canadian professional soccer club based in Montreal, Quebec. Founded in 1993, the team played in the United Soccer League. Later, the Impact played in the North American Soccer League (NASL), the second tier of the American Soccer Pyramid until the 2011 season. The owner Joey Saputo now operates the MLS team CF Montréal, which also carried the Montreal Impact name until 2021.

The team played its home games at Complexe Sportif Claude-Robillard until 2008 when it moved to the new Saputo Stadium where it played until its move to MLS. The team's colours were blue and white. The Impact had 11 different head coaches during these years.

The Impact also operated a reserve team, the Trois-Rivières Attak, from 2006 until 2010 which played in the Canadian Soccer League until 2010 when the Impact created their own Montreal Impact Academy. They also used to operate an indoor team (of the same name) in the NPSL (at the Bell Centre, then at Complexe sportif Claude-Robillard) with many of the same players, from 1997–1998 to 1999–2000.

On May 7, 2010, Impact owner Joey Saputo was granted a Major League Soccer expansion franchise set to begin play in Saputo Stadium in 2012. Although, in a legal sense, the Montreal team is an entirely separate legal entity, the new team carried the Impact name until 2021—now known as CF Montréal -- and maintains the team's legacy in MLS.

History

The Impact club was founded in 1992 by the Saputo family, as the owners of the Montreal Supra of the Canadian Soccer League did not pursue an APSL franchise by the deadline set by the U.S. league.  The Montreal ownership and front office split with their main financial sponsor announcing the start of a new APSL club on December 13, 1992, with the Supra coach.  In 1993, the APSL was trying to gain the USSF Division 1 sanctioning required by FIFA with the award of the 1994 FIFA World Cup and the estimated $60 million in World Cup profits; it was seen as a league with much more upside than the CSL. They became a dominant club in the APSL (1993–1996) and the A-League (1997–2004), renamed the USL First Division (2005). The team did not compete during the 1999 A-League season. Their main rivals were the Rochester Rhinos and the Toronto Lynx prior to the latter's move to the USL Premier Development League.

Following a lacklustre first year, the Impact surprised the defending champion Colorado Foxes (1–0) on October 15, 1994, at home in front of a sold out Montreal crowd to claim their first league title. Subsequently, the team finished first or tied for first during the regular season in 1995, 1996, 1997 and 2003 without making it back to the final. The Impact lost to archrivals Rochester in their first four playoff encounters, in 1996, 1998, 2002 and 2003, before finally defeating them in 2004 en route to their second title. The club was favoured to repeat in 2005, but after a near-flawless season (3 losses in 28 games) the Impact were ousted in the semi-finals by the eventual champions, the Seattle Sounders (2–2, 1–2). The team also won the inaugural Voyageurs Cup in 2002 and successfully defended this title from 2003 to 2008. In 2009, the Impact were crowned at home for their third title, beating the Vancouver Whitecaps FC by an aggregate score of 6–3 in a Cinderella ending to a tumultuous season.

In 2004, the Impact finished first in the A-League's Eastern Conference before disposing of Rochester (1–0, 1–0), Syracuse (2–0, 1–1), and Seattle (2–0) in the playoffs to capture their second championship, 10 years after their first. The final in Montreal saw an all-time-record 13,648 fans at Complexe sportif Claude-Robillard Stadium (whose seating capacity for the day was adjusted from 10,100). The MVP was Mauricio Vincello who scored the winner at the 33rd minute of play. Frederick Commodore sealed the game with a goal at the 78th minute.

At the gate, the Impact had always been solid within the league before 1999 with average crowds of 4,000–5,000. After disappointing seasons in 2000 and 2001 (where the average gate was between 2,000 and 3,000 people), the team had new record attendances in 2002 (over 5,000 on average), 2003 (over 7,000 on average), 2004 (over 9,000 on average) and 2005–2006 (over 11,000 on average). The all-time single-game high was the 55,571 fans in attendance for the 2009 CONCACAF Champions League quarter-final against Santos Laguna (Mexico) at Olympic Stadium in Montreal.

In 1999, the owners had a conflict with the league and withdrew the team from competition, but did play indoor soccer that year in the National Professional Soccer League. After resurfacing in 2000, the club went bankrupt during the 2001 season when the then-owners were Ionian. Administered until the end of the season by one of the original pillars, Joey Saputo, the club rose from its ashes in 2002, set up as a nonprofit organization owned by the Quebec government, Hydro-Québec, and Saputo. It also attracted many big-time sponsors such as the National Bank of Canada, Bell Canada and Coca-Cola, among others. The team's mandate is to develop local talent and to serve as a representative of Montreal for tourism. Since the Impact's renaissance in 2002, Quebec-born players have played a much more central role in the Canadian national team, after many years of non-selection. For the 2005 Gold Cup, players Gabriel Gervais, Sandro Grande, Patrick Leduc, Adam Braz and Ali Gerba, as well as former player Patrice Bernier and Quebec-born Olivier Occean were all called to the national team and did well by most accounts. The visibility helped Grande and Ali, who both transferred to Scandinavia shortly after the tournament. On July 15, 2006, the team won the 200th victory in its history.

For the first time in its history, the Montreal Impact contracted players to 10 months out of the year in 2008. This extended training camp was a first for the Montreal Impact and many in the media have stated that it is a move to next level in professional soccer. They began the year at the soccer training centre, Soccerplexe Catalogna before travelling to Italy for more training and three exhibition games against Italian clubs. They drew their first match 0–0 against third division Arezzo, lost their second match 1–0 against second division Frosinone and finally won their third encounter 1–0 against fourth division Cassino.

In 2008, the Montreal Impact won the Canadian Championship, gaining the chance to represent Canada in the CONCACAF Champions League. The tournament features the best teams in all of North and Central America and the Caribbean Islands. The Impact won two legs against Real Estali 1–0 and 0–0 to secure a spot in the tournament. Montreal competed then in the group stage where they defeated Joe Public FC of Trinidad 2–0 and 4–1 and CD Olimpia of Honduras 2–1 and 1–1. They finished off against Atlante FC of Mexico which they tied 0–0 and then lost 2–1.

On February 25, 2009, the team won the first leg of the quarterfinals match 2–0 against Santos Laguna from Mexico.  The match was played at Montreal's Olympic Stadium in front of a club-record crowd of 55,571.  The second leg was held on March 5, 2009, at Corona Stadium, in Torreon, Mexico, where the Impact led 2–1 at the half (4–1 on aggregate). With the Impact only a few minutes from a semi-final berth, Santos Laguna's Carlos Quintero scored twice in stoppage time to rally the homeside to a 5–2 victory, thus eliminating the Impact from the inaugural CONCACAF Champions League 5–4 on aggregate.  Following the match, head coach John Limniatis commented that his side "should have done better", noting that it was "unfortunate to finish this way".

For the 2009 Canadian Championship, the Montreal Impact were eliminated early to the disappointment of fans. In the final match of the Voyageurs Cup, with the Impact already eliminated, Head Coach Marc Dos Santos decision to field a number of reserve team players drew controversy from fans of both the Impact and Vancouver Whitecaps FC. The team went on to suffer its worst defeat in history, by losing 6–1 to archrival Toronto FC of Major League Soccer. Toronto FC needed to win by 4 goals to advance to the CONCACAF Champions League 2009-10 preliminary round. As a result, the Vancouver Whitecaps FC were eliminated on goal differential, despite holding the same record as Toronto FC.

The Montreal Impact won their third championship in its history, Saturday October 17, 2009, in front of a sellout crowd of 13,034 at Saputo Stadium, defeating the Vancouver Whitecaps FC 3–1, (6–3 on aggregate goals), in the First Division USL final championship, which was the first all Canadian FIrst Division USL Final. All three of Montreal's championships have been won at home. Montreal had an up and down year that involved firing their coach and struggling early on, so winning the championship was a pleasant surprise to their fans. All the players agreed this championship was more special than their first two because they were expected to win those ones, while the 2009 edition was a surprise finalist, that most experts thought wouldn't advance out of the quarterfinals.

In November 2009 the Impact announced their intent to leave the USL First Division to become the co-founders of a new North American Soccer League, which would begin play in 2010. The league, which has yet to be sanctioned by the United States Soccer Federation or the Canadian Soccer Association, would also comprise the Atlanta Silverbacks, Carolina Railhawks, Crystal Palace Baltimore, Miami FC, Minnesota Thunder, Tampa Bay Rowdies, Vancouver Whitecaps and a brand new team led by St. Louis Soccer United.

After lawsuits were filed and heated press statements exchanged, the USSF declared they would sanction neither league for the coming year, and ordered both to work together on a plan to temporarily allow their teams to play a 2010 season. The interim solution was announced on January 7, 2010, with the USSF running the new USSF D-2 league comprising clubs from both USL-1 and NASL.

The Impact and Major League Soccer

Towards the end of 2007, much speculation had been made about a possible franchise move from USL First Division to Major League Soccer.  The construction of the expandable Saputo Stadium further suggested such an interest on the part of the Impact to move up to the top level American-Canadian league.

Chairman Joey Saputo held talks with George Gillett (former owner of Montreal Canadiens and co-owner of Liverpool F.C.) regarding possible joint ownership of an MLS franchise.

On July 24, 2008, MLS announced they were seeking to add two expansion teams for the 2011 season, of which Montreal was listed as a potential candidate.

On November 22, 2008, the team's bid for an MLS franchise, was not retained by commissioner Don Garber. In response to Vancouver's successful bid in March 2009, Impact GM Nick De Santis commented that he expected chairman Joey Saputo to pursue and ultimately realize his vision of Montreal as an MLS franchise someday.

On May 16, 2009, the Montreal Gazette reported that MLS commissioner Don Garber and Montreal Impact president Joey Saputo have resumed talks for an expansion team to begin play in 2011.

On May 7, 2010, it was officially announced by MLS commissioner Don Garber that Montreal had been granted the league's 19th franchise, and will begin play in the 2012 season.

Colours and badge

The team's colours were blue and white, and the team's logo featured a stylized fleur-de-lis in blue and silver, overlaid with the Impact wordmark and a traditional hex-stitched soccer ball in flight. The fleur-de-lis is a globally recognized symbol of French heritage, and features prominently on the flag of Quebec as a reflection of French-Canadian culture. The badge featured stars to represent the league titles it won. Titles won in 1994 and 2004 resulted in the addition of the first two stars. A third star was added after the club won the USL First Division in 2009.

Stadium

 Complexe Sportif Claude-Robillard; Montreal, Quebec (1993–2007)
 Stadium at Université Laval; Quebec City, Quebec 3 games (2003–2005)
 Stadium at Université de Sherbrooke; Sherbrooke, Quebec 2 games (2004–2005)
 Saputo Stadium; Montreal, Quebec (2008–2011)

The Impact played its home games at Saputo Stadium, a soccer-specific stadium which opened in May 2008.  As the name suggests, the stadium was funded privately (mainly by the Saputo family), and cost $14.1 million CAD to build, with one-half of the cost paid by the Saputo family, and the rest coming from other private-sector contributions. Saputo Stadium was also the Impact's administrative headquarters and also includes a training field, 20 corporate boxes and full player welfare areas.

Prior to its 2012 expansion, Saputo Stadium seated 13,034 supporters in three main stands, and was expanded to seat 20,341. It is located just east of Olympic Stadium in the city's east end. Prior to moving to the new stadium, the Impact played their home games at mainly Complexe Sportif Claude-Robillard, with a handful of games also being held in stadia on University campuses at Université Laval and Université de Sherbrooke.

Club culture

Supporters

The Montreal Impact had one of the most vocal groups of supporters in the USSF D-2, the UM02, which stands for Ultras Montréal 2002. The group was created in 2002, after the re-opening of the Montréal Impact, when a group of fans decided to bring organized and vocal support to Impact games. Since their start in 2002, the group had grown from a handful of friends to a group that regularly numbers in the hundreds. The largest number of people within the group was during the February 25 match against Santos Laguna. Their slogan is "Toujours Fidèles" which is French for "Always Faithful". The UM02 has a rivalry with the supporters of the Rochester Rhinos which was at that time the Rochester Stampede, as well as the organized support of rival Toronto FC. The UM02 were located in section 132 of Saputo Stadium, the designated supporters section before the stadium was reconfigured for MLS.

Rivalries
Montreal Impact had a rivalry with the Rochester Rhinos, when the two were in the USL's First Division. In games between the two franchises, it was not uncommon for supporters of the two teams to travel to the opposing sides' stadium.

The Impact also had a rivalry with MLS side Toronto FC. Toronto FC and Montreal Impact both participated in the Canadian Championship annually along with Vancouver. On June 18, 2009, the Impact suffered its worst defeat, losing 6–1 to Toronto FC.  The lopsided loss by the Impact eliminated the Vancouver Whitecaps from the 2009 Canadian Championship, thus causing resentment among some Whitecaps fans towards the Impact. As a result, another chapter was added to the rivalry between the Whitecaps and the Impact.

Broadcasting
The Montreal Impact had a French language television deal with Radio-Canada that ran through the 2011 season. Philippe Germain did the play-by-play and Guillaume Dumas was the colour commentator. Pre-game, post-game and half-time shows featured Marie-José Turcotte and former Impact star Gabriel Gervais.

CKGM (The Team 990) was the Impact's English language radio broadcaster. Brian Wilde handled the play-by-play while Noel Butler was the colour commentator.  CKAC is the Impact's French language broadcaster with Jean-Philippe Bertrand is the play-by-play announcer, Francis Millien is the colour commentator and Jeremy Filosa reports from the sidelines.

Players and staff

Final roster
as of September 25, 2011.

Notable former players

Staff
 Joey Saputo – President
 Richard Legendre – Executive Vice President, Montreal Impact & Saputo Stadium
 Claude Pinard – Executive Vice President, Marketing & Sales
 John Di Terlizzi – Vice President, Sales
 John Papadakis – Vice President, Finances
 Nick De Santis – Sporting Director and Head Coach
 Matt Jordan – Director of Soccer Operations
 Mauro Biello – Assistant Coach
 Gil Orriols Jansana – Assistant Coach
 Youssef Dahha – Goalkeeper Coach
 Adam Braz – Team Manager
 Dr. Scott Delaney – Team Physician

Retired numbers

Head coaches
  Eddie Firmani (1993)
  Valerio Gazzola (1994–1997)
  Paul Kitson (1998)
  Tasso Koutsoukos (1998–2000)
  Zoran Jankovic (2000)
  Valerio Gazzola (2000–2001)
  Bob Lilley (2002–2003)
  John Limniatis (2008–2009)
  Marc Dos Santos (2009–2011)
  Nick DeSantis (2001, 2004–2008, 2011)

Achievements
USL First Division
Winners (2): 2004, 2009
Northeast Division Champions (2): 1997, 2003
Eastern Division Champions (2): 2004
APSL
Winners (1): 1994
Commissioner's Cup
Winners (5): 1995, 1996, 1997, 2005, 2006
Runners-up (2): 2003, 2004
Voyageurs Cup
Winners (7): 2002, 2003, 2004, 2005, 2006, 2007, 2008
Can Am Cup
Winners (3): 1998, 2003, 2004
Montreal Cup
Winners (1): 2001

Record

Year-by-year

This is a complete list of seasons for the USL/NASL franchise. For a season-by-season history including the successor Montreal Impact MLS franchise, see List of Montreal Impact seasons.

Outdoor team

1. Avg. attendance include statistics from league matches only.
2. Top goal scorer includes all goals scored in league, league playoffs, Canadian Championship, CONCACAF Champions League, FIFA Club World Cup, and other competitive continental matches.
3. Points and PPG have been adjusted from non-traditional to traditional scoring systems for seasons prior to 2003 to more effectively compare historical team performance across seasons.

Indoor team

Historical stats
Seasons:  18 (1993–1998, 2000–2011)

First Official Game: May 14, 1993 (against the Los Angeles Salsa)

First Game: April 22, 1993 (against Ponte Boggianese, Italy)

First Home Game: May 21, 1993 (against the Tampa Bay Rowdies)

Best Finish: Champion (1994, 2004, 2009)

Titles: 3 (1994, 2004, 2009)

Voyageurs Cup: 7 (2002, 2003, 2004, 2005, 2006, 2007, 2008)

Attendance record: 55 571 spectators (February 25, 2009, against the Santos Laguna CONCACAF)

Most Goals Scored: 58 (in 28 matches in 1997)

Fewest Goals Allowed: 15 (in 28 matches in 2004, 2005 and 2006)

Largest Victory (h): 6–0 (against Worcester in 1997)

Largest Victory (a): 0–5 (against Crystal Palace Baltimore in 2010)

Worst Defeat (h): 1–6 (against Toronto FC in 2009)

Worst Defeat (a): 6–0 (against Rochester in 1998)

CONCACAF Champions League: First Canadian participant in 2008, reached quarterfinals

Most goals in a game: Ali Gerba  3 goals  August 21, 2010 (against Crystal Palace Baltimore)

Earliest goal at the start of a game : Ali Gerba 18 seconds August 27, 2010  (against Rochester Rhinos)

Awards year-by-year

All-time leaders

All-time continental competition win/loss

Last updated March 22, 2010

See also
Montreal Manic
Montreal Olympique
Montreal Supra
CF Montreal
Philadelphia Fury (1978–80)

References

External links

Official website
Impact Soccer fan site
Ultras Montréal supporters' site

 
American Professional Soccer League teams
USL First Division teams
North American Soccer League teams
A-League (1995–2004) teams
Association football clubs established in 1993
Impact
Hydro-Québec
National Professional Soccer League (1984–2001) teams
Canadian indoor soccer teams
United Soccer League teams based in Canada
American Professional Soccer League teams based in Canada
1993 establishments in Quebec
2011 disestablishments in Quebec
Association football clubs disestablished in 2011